The All-America Bridge in Akron, Ohio is a viaduct carrying Ohio State Route 261 over the Little Cuyahoga River that splits into a one-way pair. Constructed 1981–1982, the bridge was named in recognition of Akron's past All-America City Awards and is also locally known as the Y-Bridge. The bridge is 134 feet tall in its highest location.

The bridge's predecessor, the 1922 North Hill Viaduct, was closed in 1977 after a long history of chunks of concrete falling from the bridge. The poem Under the Viaduct, 1932 from the Pulitzer Prize winning book of poems Thomas and Beulah by Rita Dove, referenced the North Hill Viaduct.

Over its existence, the North Hill Viaduct had been the site of at least one suicide a year, though police records were not complete. At least two survived jumps in the 1930s. The replacement bridge has also been a magnet for suicides. From 1997 until December 3, 2009, 29 people committed suicide by jumping from the bridge.

In 2009, it was announced that $1 million to $1.5 million would be spent to fence the bridge using federal economic stimulus funds. Fencing the bridge was controversial in Akron and the plan had previously failed to receive local support. Previous local attempts to fence the bridge failed in 1991, 1993, 2000 and 2006. The project was expected to be completed by September 2010 but was stopped for the winter of 2010–2011. The project was finally completed in late December 2011 at a total cost of around $8.7 million. In spite of the presence of the fence, another suicide occurred on June 28, 2012.

References

External links
Fencing the Y-Bridge, Akron Beacon Journal special section online which includes links to articles covering the fence project as well as general articles about the bridge

Bridges completed in 1978
Buildings and structures in Akron, Ohio
Transportation in Akron, Ohio
Road bridges in Ohio
Concrete bridges in the United States